Party of One is an album by Peter Elkas, released in 2003.

Track listing
 Party of One
 In My Den
 Gone, It's Gone
 Turn Out the Lights
 I See Fine
 Skipping Stone
 Build a Harmony
 Everybody Works
 Only You
 Still a Flame

External links
 Peter Elkas discography

2003 albums
Peter Elkas albums